Grover Elmer Murray (October 26, 1916 – May 22, 2003) was an American geologist, educator, and writer.

Early life
Grover Murray was born in Maiden, North Carolina. Shortly thereafter, his family moved to Newton where Murray attended public school. Upon graduation, he enrolled at the University of North Carolina at Chapel Hill and earned a degree in geology. He went on to Louisiana State University in Baton Rouge, Louisiana, where he received an M.S. in 1939 and a Ph.D. in 1942.

Louisiana State University
Murray began his career as a geologist in the petroleum industry. In 1948, he became a professor at LSU. In 1963, Murray was promoted to Vice President and Dean of Academic Affairs. Two years later, he became Vice President for Academic Affairs for the entire Louisiana State University System.

Texas Tech
On September 1, 1966, Murray departed Louisiana for Lubbock, Texas, where he had accepted the job as president of Texas Technological College. During his time there, which ended in 1976, the school expanded considerably. The law school and medical school were built and the International Center for Arid and Semi-Arid Land Studies was created. As a result, also during Murray's time, the name of the school was changed from Texas Technological College to Texas Tech University.

He was a member of the International Commission on the History of Geological Sciences since 1967.

Later life
After retiring as the president of Texas Tech, Murray continued to teach a geology course. Further, he returned to geologic consulting. In 1996, he was awarded the William H. Twenhofel Medal, which is the highest award given by the Society for Sedimentary Geology. Also in 1996, Murray and his wife, Sally, created the Grover E. Murray Education Award. Funded by Murray, the AAPG Grover E. Murray Memorial Distinguished Educator Award is also named in his honor.

References

External links
Texas Tech University

1916 births
2003 deaths
People from Newton, North Carolina
Presidents of Texas Tech University
20th-century American geologists
People from Baton Rouge, Louisiana
People from Lubbock, Texas
People from Maiden, North Carolina
Louisiana State University faculty
20th-century American academics